Brieya is a genus of flowering plants belonging to the family Annonaceae.

Its native range is Western and Western Central Tropical Africa.

Species:

Brieya fasciculata 
Brieya latipetala

References

Annonaceae
Annonaceae genera
Taxa named by Émile Auguste Joseph De Wildeman